Simulations Canada is the name of a Canadian board wargame publisher established in Nova Scotia in 1977. The company was founded by Stephen Newberg as a one-man operation and was one of only a handful of companies devoted to publishing wargames at that time. Other companies such as Avalon Hill and Simulations Publications, Inc. did not accept unsolicited submissions, resulting in the creation of the company.

Stephen Newberg, with assistance from other designers and graphic artists, produced a relatively large output of games in the first years of the company, focusing on a wide mix of historical subjects not covered by other publishers.

As the wargames industry grew, Simulations Canada made a number of text-only computer wargames that included a traditional board-game map and counters. The company decided to focus entirely on computer games by 1986. In 2001, Simulations Canada entered into a partnership with Matrix Games to publish some of Simulations Canada's computer titles, resulting in the release of Flashpoint Germany in 2005. In 2004, another partnership with Omega Games saw the rerelease of Line of Battle and Battleship.

Simulations Canada is currently based on Vancouver Island, British Columbia and continues to create and produce innovating materials.

Games

Board games

Computer games

References

Sources
Canadiansoldiers.com article on Simulations Canada

Board game publishing companies
Wargame companies